The Archdiocese of Szczecin-Kamień is an archdiocese located in the cities of Szczecin and Kamień Pomorski in Poland. With 24,3% of its population attending church services weekly or more in 2013 it is the least devoutly religious diocese in Poland.

History

 1945: part of the territory of the Apostolic Administration of Kamień, Lubusz and the Prelature of Piła
 June 28, 1972: Created as Diocese of Szczecin – Kamień, part of the ecclesiastical province of Gniezno, from the northwestern part of the territory of the Apostolic Administration of Kamień, Lubusz and the Prelature of Piła, previously part of the Diocese of Berlin in Germany
 March 25, 1992: Promoted as Metropolitan Archdiocese of Szczecin – Kamień

Leadership

 Archbishop Jerzy Stroba (28 Jun 1972 Appointed – 21 Sep 1978 Appointed, Archbishop of Poznań)
 Archbishop Kazimierz Jan Majdański (1 Mar 1979 Appointed – 25 Mar 1992 Retired)
 Archbishop Marian Przykucki (25 Mar 1992 Appointed – 1 May 1999 Retired)
 Archbishop Zygmunt Kamiński (1 May 1999 Appointed – 21 Feb 2009 Retired)
 Archbishop Andrzej Dzięga (21 Feb 2009 Appointed – )

Suffragan dioceses
 Koszalin-Kołobrzeg
 Zielona Góra-Gorzów

See also
Roman Catholicism in Poland

Sources
 GCatholic.org
 Catholic Hierarchy
  Diocese website

Roman Catholic dioceses in Poland
Szczecin-Kamien Diocese